Maxim Alexeevich Akimov (born 1 March 1970) is a Russian politician, CEO of the Russian Post since 2020. Previously he was served as the Deputy Prime Minister of Russia from 2018–2020.

Early life
Akimov was born in the city of Maloyaroslavets, in Kaluga Oblast.

In 1993 he graduated from Kaluga State University.

From 1994 to 1996, he was the CEO of the Faynart-Audit company, then headed the Commission for the Securities Market of the Kaluga Oblast. From 1998 to 2001, he served as the Deputy Director of the Department of Economy and Industry of Kaluga Oblast.

In 2004, he served as the Minister of Economic Development of Kaluga Oblast. In May 2004, he went to work for the municipal Government of Kaluga as the First Deputy Mayor. He later became acting Mayor. On 14 November 2004, he was elected as Mayor of Kaluga with 34.63% of the vote.

In July 2007, he was appointed Deputy Governor of Kaluga Oblast Anatoly Artamonov.

On 22 May 2012 he was appointed Deputy Chief of Staff of the Government of Russia. A year later, he took the place of First Deputy Chief of Staff.

On 7 May 2018, he was nominated for the post of Deputy Prime Minister for Transport, Communications and Digital Economy. On 15 January 2020, he resigned as part of the cabinet, after President Vladimir Putin delivered the Presidential Address to the Federal Assembly, in which he proposed several amendments to the constitution.

On 4 February 2020, the board of directors of the Russian Post appointed Akimov CEO of the organization for 5 years.

Personal life
Maxim Akimov is married. He has two sons.

References

1970 births
Living people
1st class Active State Councillors of the Russian Federation
People from Maloyaroslavetsky District
United Russia politicians
21st-century Russian politicians
Mayors of Kaluga
People from Kaluga
20th-century Russian historians
Deputy heads of government of the Russian Federation
Kaluga State University alumni